Terengganu Amateur League is an association football league held in Terengganu, Malaysia. The League is one of the affiliated league of Malaysian M4 League, a fourth-tier league in Malaysia football league system.

It was established in 2015 by Terengganu Football Association to provide an alternative entry point for young players. The defending champion is Kerteh FC.

Clubs which earns their promotion will be promoted to the third-tier of Malaysia league, the Malaysia M3 League. Currently, there is no official relegation for the Terengganu Amateur League as they are the lowest level in the national level competition. Although clubs which decided to pulled from the league may pulled from the competition altogether or return to their respective state leagues.

Champions

League

Super League

2018 : Besut United
 2019 : Besut United

Premier League

 2018 : DSPEX FC
 2019 : Kerteh F.C.

TAL Cup

Performance by club (2015–present)

Sponsorship 
For 2017 season
 Norlan United
 Semuanya Bola
 Matt Barbershop
 Kaki Jersi
 FLN Enterprise
 Power Mania Gym
 Visit Terengganu

References

External links
Official Website

4
Malay
Sports leagues established in 2015